Ines or INES may refer to:

People
 Ines (name), a feminine given name, also written as Inés or Inês
 Saint Ines or Agnes, Roman virgin–martyr
 Eda-Ines Etti (stage name: Ines; born 1981), Estonian singer

Places
 Doña Ines, a volcano in Chile
 Institute of Applied Sciences Ruhengeri, a Rwandan university

Science and technology
 International Network of Engineers and Scientists for Global Responsibility
 International Nuclear Event Scale

Other uses
 iNES (TV service), a Romanian IPTV television streaming service

 Carte d'identité nationale électronique sécurisée, proposed French national identity card

See also
 INE (disambiguation)
 Santa Ines (disambiguation)